Florin Ionel Țîrcă (born 1 February 1984) is a Romanian football defender who plays for German club SC Tuttlingen. Țîrcă is the product of Gloria Bistrița football academy, but his best period as a player was at Bihor Oradea, where he played nearly 100 matches and for a while was also the team captain.

References

External links
 
 Florin Țîrcă at fupa.net

1984 births
Living people
Sportspeople from Bistrița
Romanian footballers
Association football defenders
Liga I players
Liga II players
ACF Gloria Bistrița players
ACS Sticla Arieșul Turda players
FC Bihor Oradea players
Romanian expatriate footballers
Expatriate footballers in Germany
Romanian expatriate sportspeople in Germany
21st-century Romanian people